Aleh Loban (born 15 January 1985) is a Belarusian weighlifter. He competed at the 2013 World Championships in the Men's 105 kg, winning the Bronze medal in snatch.

References

External links

Belarusian male weightlifters
1985 births
Living people
Place of birth missing (living people)
21st-century Belarusian people